It's All Over Town is a 1964 British musical film starring Frankie Vaughan. It was directed by Douglas Hickox who said they shot it in 15 days without sound and the "script consisted of two tiny typewritten pages, badly typewritten at that." The film features Lance Percival as a daydreaming stage technician and Willie Rushton as his friend, and includes songs performed by the Springfields, Clodagh Rodgers, the Bachelors, Acker Bilk and the Hollies, as well as Frankie Vaughan.

Cast
 Frankie Vaughan as himself
 Lance Percival as Richard Abel
 Willie Rushton as Fat Friend
 Acker Bilk as himself
 The Springfields as Themselves
 The Hollies as Themselves
 The Bachelors as Themselves
 Cloda Rogers as herself (spelling used in screen credits)
 Wayne Gibson as himself
 Jan and Kelly as Themselves
 Ivor Cutler as Salvationist
 Ingrid Anthofer as herself
 April Olrich as Russian Dancer
 Stephen Jack as narrator

References

External links

It's All Over Town at BFI

1964 films
1964 musical films
British musical films
Films shot at MGM-British Studios
1960s British films